

Events
Between January and April – Beethoven and Mozart: 16-year-old Ludwig van Beethoven goes to Vienna, intending to study with Mozart: it is possible that they meet, but the declining health of Beethovens' mother forces him to return to Bonn.
February 1 – A posthumous performance of Antonio Sacchini's Œdipe à Colone at the Paris Opéra results in the previously unsuccessful opera becoming one of the most popular pieces in the repertoire for several decades.
August 10 – Wolfgang Amadeus Mozart completes his famous serenade Eine kleine Nachtmusik.
October 29 – Mozart's opera Don Giovanni is premiered under his baton at the Nostitzsches Nationaltheater in Prague, with libretto by Lorenzo Da Ponte.
December
Mozart is appointed chamber composer to Emperor Joseph II in Vienna following the death of Gluck.
Angelo Tarchi is appointed music director and composer at the King's Theatre in London.
Luigi Boccherini becomes court composer in Berlin.
Luigi Cherubini settles in Paris.

Publications
Scots Musical Museum, vol. 1

Published popular music
Robert Burns – "The Battle of Sherramuir" (to a traditional tune)
"Ein Schifflein sah ich fahren" (Soldier Song ca.1787)

Classical music
Carl Philipp Emanuel Bach 
Fantasia in F-sharp minor, H.300
Neue Melodien, H.781
William Brown – 3 Rondos
Charles Burney – Preludes, Fugues and Interludes for the Organ
Muzio Clementi 
Two Symphonies, Op. 18
Musical Characteristics, Op. 19
Piano Sonata, Op. 20
Michel Corrette – Pièces pour l’orgue dans un genre nouveau
Francois Devienne – Flute Concerto No.7 in E minor
Jean-Louis Duport – Cello Concerto No.1 in A major, Op. 1
Giuseppe Gherardeschi – Sonata for Organ "In the Guise of a Military Band..."
Joseph Haydn
The Seven Last Words of Christ
Symphony No. 88 in G
String Quartets, Op. 50 (String Quartets Nos. 36–41)
Franz Anton Hoffmeister – 2 Keyboard Sonatas, WeiH 80
Leopold Kozeluch
Three Symphonies, Op. 22
Three Symphonies, Op. 24
Moise in Egitto
Joseph Martin Kraus – Symphony in E minor
Jose Lidon – 6 Piezas o Sonatas sueltas para órgano
Wolfgang Amadeus Mozart
Eine kleine Nachtmusik
String Quintet No. 3 in C major
String Quintet No. 4 in G minor
Rondo in A minor, K.511
Clarinet Quintet, K.Anh.91
Musikalisches Würfelspiel, K.516f
"Die Alte", K.517
"Die Verschweigung", K.518
"Das Lied der Trennung", K.519
"Als Luise die Briefe", K.520
"Abendempfindung", K.523
"Die kleine Spinnerin", K.531
5 Country Dances, K.609
William Parsons – The Court Minuets for Her Majesty's Birth Day, 1787
Philip Phile – Violin Concerto (lost)
Ignaz Pleyel – 3 String Trios, B.401–403

Opera
Samuel Arnold – Inkle and Yarico (libretto by George Colman the Younger)
Domenico Cimarosa – Volodimiro
Giuseppe Gazzaniga – Don Giovanni
Vicente Martín y Soler – L'arbore di Diana
Wolfgang Amadeus Mozart – Don Giovanni
Antonio Salieri – Tarare (libretto by Beaumarchais)
Giovanni Paisiello – La modista raggiratrice, R.1.74

Methods and theory writings 

 Ferdinand Kauer – Kurzgefaßte Clavierschule für Anfänger
 Edward Miller – Elements of Thorough Bass and Composition, Op. 5
 Etienne Ozi – Nouvelle méthode de basson
  – Über die Harmonika

Births
January 31 – Ulric Guttinguer, librettist and writer (died 1866)
February 13 – James P. Carrell, singing teacher and composer (died 1854)
February 24 – Christian Frederik Barth, oboist and composer (died 1861)
March 1 – Tobias Haslinger, composer and publisher (died 1842)
April 14 – Charles-François Plantade, French composer (died 1870)
April 26 – Ludwig Uhland, librettist and poet (died 1862)
July 7 – César Malan, composer and theologian (died 1864)
August 15 – Alexander Alyabyev, composer (died 1851)
November 17 – Michele Carafa, composer (died 1872)
November 21 – Barry Cornwall, librettist and poet (died 1874)
November 25 – Franz Xaver Gruber, organist and composer of "Silent Night" (died 1863)
December 4 – Johan Fredrik Berwald, violinist, conductor and composer (died 1861)
December 13 – Anne-Honoré-Joseph Duveyrier, librettist and dramatist (died 1865)
December 14 – Maria Ludovika, patron of Beethoven and queen of Austria (died 1816)
date unknown 
Franz Xaver Gebel, German composer (died 1843)
Catharina Torenberg, violinist (died 1866)

Deaths
February 21 – Antonio Rodríguez de Hita, composer (born 1722)
March 30 – Princess Anna Amalia of Prussia, musician, composer and music collector (born 1723)
April 22 – Josef Starzer, Austrian composer (born 1726)
May 20 – Giovan Gualberto Brunetti, Italian composer (born 1706)
May 28 – Leopold Mozart, violinist, music teacher and composer (born 1719)
June – Ignazio Fiorillo, opera composer (born 1715)
June 20 – Carl Friedrich Abel, viola da gamba player and composer (born 1723)
July 13 – Ignazio Cirri, composer and musician (born 1711)
July 27 – Mary Linley, singer (born 1758)
August 5 – François Francoeur, violinist and composer (born 1698)
August 18 – Stephen Paxton, composer and musician (born 1734)
November 15 – Christoph Willibald Gluck, composer (born 1714)
November 23 – Anton Schweitzer, opera composer (born 1735)
December 9 – Bernhard Joachim Hagen, composer, violinist and lutenist (born 1720)
date unknown – Edward Harwood (of Darwen), hymn-writer (born 1707)

References

 
18th century in music
Music by year
Music-related lists